Something Else was a television show, produced by the British Broadcasting Corporation (BBC) and scheduled on its BBC2 channel between 1978 and 1982, targeted specifically at a youth audience. It began in 1978 on Saturday evenings and is an early example in British television of the genre known as "Youth TV" (later deliberately misspelled and referred to as "Yoof TV"), encompassing unknown and largely untrained young presenters with undisguised regional accents, minimal scripting, a magazine format, and freeform discussion of contemporary concerns to young people, interspersed with performances by up-and-coming new bands.

The programme's innovative presentation style influenced subsequent shows in the genre such as The Tube, Oxford Road Show, Network 7 and The Word. It was also satirised by Not the Nine O'Clock News (as Hey Wow), which began that same autumn, and also in The Young Ones (as Nozin' Aroun).

During its run, it captured on film The Clash performing "Clash City Rockers" and "Tommy Gun" in 1978, in their only televised performance for the BBC; the last (and only nationally broadcast) television appearance by Joy Division, playing "Transmission" and "She's Lost Control" live in the studio in September 1979; The Jam (on the same episode) playing "Eton Rifles"; and U2 featured in May 1982 performing a three-song set consisting of "Rejoice", "I Will Follow" and "With a Shout (Jerusalem)", promoting their second L.P., 'October'.Programme guide'

1978-03-11 The Clash
1979-09-15 The Jam / Joy Division / John Cooper Clarke (in Manchester)
1979-10-06 The Specials / Linton Kwesi Johnson
1979-11-03 Siouxsie and the Banshees
1979-12-22 The Skids / The Revillos
1979-12-01 Rudi / The Undertones
1980-05-24 Secret Affair / Sad Café
1980-11-10 Dexy's Midnight Runners / Regulators
1980-11-17 Young Marble Giants / The Damned
1980-11-24 The Specials / General Accident
1980-12-08 Ian Dury & The Blockheads / Sect
1980-12-15 Siouxsie & The Banshees / God's Toys
1981-01-05 Adam & The Ants / Linx
1981-09-25 Angelic Upstarts / Tygers of Pan Tang
1981-10-02 The Questions / Dolly Mixture / The Jam / Aidan Cant / Anne Clark
1981-10-09 The Beat / Talisman
1981-10-16 The Raincoats / Fay Ray
1981-10-23 Dodo Vision / Kirsty MacColl
1981-11-06 Orange Juice / Depeche Mode
1982-05-07 Steel Pulse / Clint Eastwood & General Saint
1982-01-01 Compilation of performances.
1982-04-23 Fun Boy Three
1982-04-30 Dr Fantasy's Devils / Blue Poland
1982-05-14 Jam Today / Sophisticated Boom Boom
1982-05-21 U2
1982-10-01 Birds With Ears
1982-10-15 Abacush / Barnes & Barnes
1982-10-23 Joeys
1982-10-25 debates
1982-10-27 debates
1982-10-28 debates
1982-10-29 debates
1982-11-05 John Cooper Clarke / Linton Kwesi Johnson / Steel

References 

1978 British television series debuts
1982 British television series endings
1970s British television series
1980s British television series
BBC Television shows